

Dinosaurs

Newly named dinosaurs
Data are courtesy of George Olshevky's dinosaur genera list.

Plesiosaurs

New taxa

Synapsids

Non-mammalian

References

1940s in paleontology
Paleontology
Paleontology 3